"Wonderlust King" is a song by gypsy punk band Gogol Bordello, written by frontman Eugene Hütz. It was released as the first and only single from 2007's Super Taranta!, and it was their fourth single overall.

Music video 

The video consists of footage of Romani people from the Carpaty region of Ukraine, taken from the documentary The Pied Piper of Hützovina. It also includes images of Hütz singing and playing guitar on the boardwalk of Coney Island and against a map, jumping, among other things.

Gogol Bordello songs
2007 singles
2007 songs